Mārcis Štrobinders (born 12 June 1966) is a Latvian athlete. He competed in the men's javelin throw at the 1992 Summer Olympics.

References

1966 births
Living people
Athletes (track and field) at the 1992 Summer Olympics
Latvian male javelin throwers
Olympic athletes of Latvia
Competitors at the 1994 Goodwill Games
Goodwill Games medalists in athletics